LUNO is a Czech band that combines several musical genres. The band calls its music psycho pop, though strong rock influences are traceable in LUNO's music. The band was founded in 2009 and consists of: Ema Brabcová (Dietrichová), Martin Chmátal (Šmity), Jan Janečka and Martyn Starý (Marty)

History
LUNO's most significant feature is the voice of the Czech singer Ema Brabcová who, in the past, sang in other Czech bands Roe-Deer (here she met Šmity) and Khoiba. With Khoiba she supported The Cure in Berlin. Šmity has for more than 17 years been part of the Czech music scene – he co-founded Roe-Deer and played in another successful Czech band The Protitutes. Originally it was Mejla Kukulský (Vypsaná fixa) who was to be drafted as the guitarist, however, due to lack of time he had to refuse. He was substituted by Marty Starý (also Holden Caulfield). Honza Janečka, well-known Czech drummer (formerly for Southpaw), was from the outset picked as the most suitable one for LUNO. He has collaborated, among others, with Glen Hansard, James Harris and the Czech band Republic Of Two.

LUNO's eponymous debut was released on Christmas 2010 and the release-concert took place in Prague on 18 January 2010. The debut's single video Close To Violence reached 3000 hits during the first week. The web music magazine described said: "The album's breathtaking diversity is its golden thread."

In January 2012 the debut was chosen by the web music magazine Musicserver as the 9th best Czech album of 2011.

EP LITATO, the more light-hearted follow-up, was released in 2011.

Since its formation LUNO has played more than 40 concerts and many festivals. Among the most important ones are the biggest Czech festival Colours of Ostrava (2011), Slovak Pohoda and Grape Festivals (2011) and the German Wave Gottik Treffen.

All albums were released in Germany by PALE music.

Discography
LUNO albums (in chronological order):
LUNO (2010)
LITATO (EP, 2011)
ZEROTH (2012)
LIFECYCLES (EP, 2014)

References

External links 
 Official band website

Czech alternative rock groups
Musical groups established in 2009
Czech experimental music groups
2009 establishments in the Czech Republic